Pongola Airport  is an airport serving Pongola, a town in the KwaZulu-Natal, South Africa.

Facilities
It only services light local traffic.

See also
 List of airports in South Africa

References

Airports in South Africa
Transport in KwaZulu-Natal
Zululand District Municipality